Dmitry Avaliani (6 August 1938 – 19 December 2003) was a Russian poet and palindromist, who made "important" contributions to Russian visual poetry. He invented and perfected the Russian ambigram, called listoverten' (could be loosely translated as rotate-page). This is a short text (usually just a few words) written so that after rotating 90° or 180° it is legible as a different text, or sometimes the same.  Sometimes the two texts together make up one idea, and rhyme. He was especially interested in pantorhyme, anagram and other especially difficult ways of rhyming.

References
 Contemporary Russian Poets Database Dmitry Avaliani
 The Russian Poetry Festival Oct. 17–19, 1998 , St. Petersburg A report from Masha Zavialova
 Russian Poetry Now – Samizdat Magazine

External links 
  English translations of five palindrome poems

1938 births
2003 deaths
Russian male poets
20th-century Russian poets
20th-century Russian male writers
Moscow State University alumni